Bellingham School District No. 501 (referred to as Bellingham Public Schools) is a public school district in Whatcom County, Washington, United States, that serves the city of Bellingham.

As of the 2019–2020 school year, the district had an enrollment of 12,027 students.

In 2006, the Center for Digital Education named the Bellingham School District 6th in the nation for districts with 2501-15000 students.

Schools

High schools
Grades 9 - 12
Bellingham High School
Options High School
Sehome High School
Squalicum High School

Middle schools
Grades 6 - 8
Fairhaven Middle School
Kulshan Middle School
Shuksan Middle School
Whatcom Middle School

Elementary schools
Grades K - 5
Alderwood Elementary School
Birchwood Elementary School
Carl Cozier Elementary School
Columbia Elementary School
Cordata Elementary School
Geneva Elementary School
Happy Valley Elementary School
Lowell Elementary School
Northern Heights Elementary School
Parkview Elementary School
Roosevelt Elementary School
Silver Beach Elementary School
Sunnyland Elementary School
Wade King Elementary School

Other programs 
 Family Partnership Program

The Bellingham Promise
The strategic plan of Bellingham Public Schools is The Bellingham Promise.

References

External links

Bellingham School District Report Card

School districts in Washington (state)
Schools in Bellingham, Washington
Education in Whatcom County, Washington
Education in Bellingham, Washington
School districts established in 1884
1884 establishments in Washington Territory